In mathematics, the Fraňková–Helly selection theorem is a generalisation of Helly's selection theorem for functions of bounded variation to the case of regulated functions. It was proved in 1991 by the Czech mathematician Dana Fraňková.

Background

Let X be a separable Hilbert space, and let BV([0, T]; X) denote the normed vector space of all functions f : [0, T] → X with finite total variation over the interval [0, T], equipped with the total variation norm. It is well known that BV([0, T]; X) satisfies the compactness theorem known as Helly's selection theorem: given any sequence of functions (fn)n∈N in BV([0, T]; X) that is uniformly bounded in the total variation norm, there exists a subsequence

and a limit function f ∈ BV([0, T]; X) such that fn(k)(t) converges weakly in X to f(t) for every t ∈ [0, T]. That is, for every continuous linear functional λ ∈ X*,

Consider now the Banach space Reg([0, T]; X) of all regulated functions f : [0, T] → X, equipped with the supremum norm. Helly's theorem does not hold for the space Reg([0, T]; X): a counterexample is given by the sequence

One may ask, however, if a weaker selection theorem is true, and the Fraňková–Helly selection theorem is such a result.

Statement of the Fraňková–Helly selection theorem

As before, let X be a separable Hilbert space and let Reg([0, T]; X) denote the space of regulated functions f : [0, T] → X, equipped with the supremum norm. Let (fn)n∈N be a sequence in Reg([0, T]; X) satisfying the following condition: for every ε > 0, there exists some Lε > 0 so that each fn may be approximated by a un ∈ BV([0, T]; X) satisfying

and

where |-| denotes the norm in X and Var(u) denotes the variation of u, which is defined to be the supremum

over all partitions

of [0, T]. Then there exists a subsequence

and a limit function f ∈ Reg([0, T]; X) such that fn(k)(t) converges weakly in X to f(t) for every t ∈ [0, T]. That is, for every continuous linear functional λ ∈ X*,

References

 

Theorems in analysis
Compactness theorems